Surroj is a village and a former municipality in Kukës County, Albania. After the 2015 local government reform, it became a subdivision of the municipality Kukës. The population at the 2011 census was 1,099. The municipal unit consists of the following villages:

 Surroj
 Çinamakë
 Fusharrë
 Aliaj

References

Former municipalities in Kukës County
Administrative units of Kukës
Villages in Kukës County